The following legal minimum ages apply in Belgium:

 Legal age to purchase beer and wine: 16
 Legal age to purchase spirits: 18 
 Legal age to buy tobacco products: 18  
 Legal age to enter a dance without PG: 16 
 Legal age to book a room: 18
 Legal age to fly an airplane: 16
 Legal age to drive a car: 18 
 Legal age to have sex: 16 (there is a close-in-age exemption of 2 years if at least one of the partners is 14 or 15 years old) 
 Legal age to prostitute yourself: 18 (pimping is illegal)
 Legal age to marry: 18
 Compulsory education until the age of 18
 Voting is mandatory for all Belgians 18 and above.
 Army duty is not mandatory anymore.
 Legal age to enter a casino to gamble: 21
 Legal age to get a radioamateur license: 13

References 

Law of Belgium
Society of Belgium
Juvenile law
Belgium